The Gadsden flag is a historical American flag with a yellow field depicting a timber rattlesnake coiled and ready to strike. Beneath the rattlesnake are the words: " TREAD ON ME". Some modern versions of the flag include an apostrophe.

The flag is named for Christopher Gadsden, South Carolina delegate to the Continental Congress and brigadier general in the Continental Army. Gadsden designed the flag in 1775 during the American Revolution. He gifted it to Commodore Esek Hopkins, and the flag was unfurled on the main mast of Hopkins' flagship, USS Alfred, on December 20, 1775. Two days later, Congress made Hopkins commander-in-chief of the Continental Navy. He adopted the Gadsden banner as his personal flag, flying it "from the mainmast of the flagship" while he was aboard. The Continental Marines also flew the flag during the early part of the war.

In the context of the American Revolution, the rattlesnake was a "symbol of the unity" of the colonies, and had "long been a political symbol" in America; Benjamin Franklin used the animal for his Join, or Die woodcut in 1754. Gadsden intended his flag as a "warning to Great Britain" not to violate the liberties of its American subjects. 

The flag has been described as the "most popular symbol of the American revolution." Its design proclaims an assertive warning of vigilance and willingness to act in defense against coercion. This has led it to be associated with the ideas of individualism and liberty. It is often used in the United States as a symbol for right-libertarianism, classical liberalism, and small government; for distrust or defiance against authorities and government; and occasionally co-opted for right-wing populism or far-right ideology.

Appearance and symbolism

Variations in appearance
Many variations of the Gadsden flag exist. The motto sometimes includes an apostrophe in the word "Don't" and sometimes not; the typeface used for the motto is sometimes a serif typeface and other times sans-serif. The rattlesnake sometimes is shown as resting on a green ground; representations dating from 1885 and 1917 do not display anything below the rattlesnake. The rattlesnake usually faces to the left, and the early representations mentioned above face left. However, some versions of the flag show the snake facing to the right.

History of rattlesnake symbol in America

The timber rattlesnake can be found in the area of the original Thirteen Colonies. Like the bald eagle, part of its significance is that it was unique to the Americas, serving as a means of showing a separate identity from the Old World. Its use as a symbol of the American colonies can be traced back to the publications of Benjamin Franklin. In 1751, he made the first reference to the rattlesnake in a satirical commentary published in his Pennsylvania Gazette. It had been the policy of Parliament to send convicted criminals to the Americas (primarily the Province of Georgia), so Franklin suggested that they thank them by sending rattlesnakes to Britain.

In 1754, during the French and Indian War, Franklin published Join, or Die, a woodcut of a snake cut into eight sections. It represented the colonies, with New England joined as the head and South Carolina as the tail, following their order along the coast. This was the first political cartoon published in an American newspaper.

In 1774, Paul Revere added Franklin's iconic cartoon to the nameplate of Isaiah Thomas's paper, the Massachusetts Spy, depicted there as fighting a British griffin.

In December 1775, Benjamin Franklin published an essay in the Pennsylvania Journal under the pseudonym "American Guesser" in which he suggested that the rattlesnake was a good symbol for the American spirit and its valuation for vigilance, assertiveness, individualism, unity, and liberty:[...] there was painted a Rattle-Snake, with this modest motto under it, "Don't tread on me." [...] she has no eye-lids. She may therefore be esteemed an emblem of vigilance. She never begins an attack, nor, when once engaged, ever surrenders [...] The Rattle-Snake is solitary, and associates with her kind only when it is necessary for their preservation [...] 'Tis curious and amazing to observe how distinct and independent of each other the rattles of this animal are, and yet how firmly they are united together, so as never to be separated but by breaking them to pieces. [...] The power of fascination attributed to her, by a generous construction, may be understood to mean, that those who consider the liberty and blessings which America affords, and once come over to her, never afterwards leave her, but spend their lives with her.
The rattlesnake symbol was first officially adopted by the Continental Congress in 1778 when it approved the design for the seal of the War Office. At the top center of the seal is a rattlesnake holding a banner that says, "This we'll defend". This design of the War Office seal was carried forward—with some minor modifications—into the subsequent designs as well as the Department of the Army's seal, emblem and flag. As such, some variation of a rattlesnake symbol has been in continuous official use by the US Army for over 243 years.

Other American flags that use a rattlesnake motif include The United Companies of the Train of Artillery of the Town of Providence, the First Navy Jack, and the Culpeper Minutemen flag, among others.

In the 21st century, the Gadsden Flag has been used by the Tea Party movement and has been sometimes been associated with the Patriot movement.

History

In the fall of 1775, the Continental Navy was established by General George Washington in his role as Commander in Chief of all Continental Forces, before Esek Hopkins was named Commodore of the Navy.
Those first ships were used to intercept incoming transport ships carrying war supplies to the British in the colonies in order to supply the Continental Army, which was desperately undersupplied in the opening years of the American Revolutionary War. The Second Continental Congress authorized the mustering of five companies of Marines to accompany the Navy on their first mission.

Continental Colonel Christopher Gadsden represented his home state of South Carolina in the Congress, and was one of seven members of the Marine Committee outfitting the first naval mission. Writing in 2008, Paul Aron described Gadsden as a "leading advocate of an American navy." The first Marines enlisted in the city of Philadelphia and carried drums painted yellow and depicting a coiled rattlesnake with thirteen rattles along with the motto "Don't Tread on Me." This is the first recorded mention of the future Gadsden flag's symbolism.

Gadsden decided the American navy needed a distinctive flag, and took it upon himself to make one in 1775. Before his departure in December 1775, the newly appointed commander-in-chief of the Navy, Commodore Esek Hopkins, received a yellow rattlesnake flag from Gadsden to serve as his personal standard on USS Alfred, the flagship of America's first navy squadron. Gadsden intended the design as a warning to Great Britain not to trample the liberties of its subjects. Writer Daniel J. McDonough described it in 2000 as the "famous gray coiled rattlesnake poised upon a bright yellow background," and remarked that it "quickly became popular among the American public." In addition to its prior history as an American symbol, the rattlesnake was seen at the time in Gadsden's birthplace of Charleston, South Carolina as a "noble and useful" animal that gave warning before it attacked. Writing in 2008, Aron observed that as a man who "grew up in South Carolina's lowcountry," Gadsden would have "learned to respect rattlesnakes." Before being appointed to lead the Navy, Commodore Hopkins had previously led The United Companies of the Train of Artillery of the Town of Providence, a unit that flew a flag similar to Gadsden's. The Gadsden flag was first seen unfurled on the main mast of USS Alfred on December 20, 1775, while the ship rested at anchor in Chesapeake Bay.  Whenever he was aboard, Hopkins flew the flag from the mainmast of the flagship as his personal banner. Alfred was also the first recorded ship to fly the Grand Union Flag, the first national flag of the United States, when Senior Lieutenant John Paul Jones hoisted it on December 3, 1775 while the ship floated in the Delaware River near Philadelphia. 

By winter 1775, the South Carolina Provincial Congress expected that the British would invade Charleston—which they attempted in June 1776—and decided to recall Gadsden home from Congress in Philadelphia to command the provincial troops, specifically the 1st South Carolina Regiment. By January 14, Gadsden had both his orders to return home and permission from the Continental Congress to leave. On Friday, February 9, 1776, he made a "triumphal entry" to the South Carolina Congress and presented an example of his yellow rattlesnake flag to the president of the Congress, William Henry Drayton. As Gadsden walked to the front of the room, some members cheered, and Drayton ordered the flag displayed to the left of his presidential chair. The Provincial Congress "promptly approved" a resolution thanking Gadsden for his service in Philadelphia, appointed him to a defense committee and, that same day, included his name on a committee tasked with forming a temporary system of government for the colony. The Continental Congress had recommended that the colonies create temporary governments and maintain them until the trouble with Britain was resolved; the day before Gadsden arrived, the South Carolina Congress created a committee to consider this recommendation, and this is the committee to which Gadsden was added. The next day, February 10, Gadsden announced his support for American independence and gave a speech that, according to Drayton, fell on the legislature "like an explosion of thunder." John Rutledge accused Gadsden of treason, and members found themselves frightened by the idea of independence; according to E. Stanly Godbold Jr. and Robert Hilliard Woody in their 1982 biography of Gadsden, the South Carolina Congress was sent "into chaos." Despite the impact of this speech, however, the exact words Gadsden spoke "were not recorded." 

Gadsden's presentation of the rattlesnake flag was recorded in the South Carolina congressional journals on February 9, 1776:

The Gadsden flag has been described as the "first American flag designed expressly for American naval use," and newspaper accounts at the time indicate there was some discussion about adopting it as the "colors of the American navy." The Continental Marines also used the flag during the war. On January 5, 1776, Commodore Hopkins proclaimed a series of flag signals that were included in the Orders and Directions for the Commander-in-Chief of Fleet of United Colonies, issued by the Naval Committee of the Continental Congress; among the flags Hopkins listed was "the Standard or Gadsden's flag." By late 1775, especially after the Prohibitory Act, many American colonists did not see themselves as subjects to The Crown but instead as independent individuals possessing the rights of liberty and revolution. These rapidly growing convictions helped fuel the flag's adoption.

Modern use

For historical reasons, the Gadsden flag is still popularly flown in Charleston, South Carolina, the city where Christopher Gadsden first presented the flag and where it was commonly used during the revolution, along with the blue and white crescent flag of pre-Civil War South Carolina.

The Gadsden flag has become a popular specialty license plate in several states. , the following states offer the option of obtaining a Gadsden flag specialty license plate: Alabama, Arizona,
Florida, Kansas, Maryland, Missouri, Montana, Oklahoma, South Carolina, Tennessee, Texas, and Virginia.

Use as a libertarian symbol
In the 1970s the Gadsden flag started being used by libertarians, using it as a symbol representing individual rights and limited government. The flag's prominent yellow color is also strongly associated with libertarianism. The libertarian Free State Project uses a modified version of the flag with the snake replaced with a porcupine, a symbol of the movement.

Use as an terrorist symbol
In 2014, the flag was used by Jerad and Amanda Miller, the perpetrators of the 2014 Las Vegas shootings who killed two police officers and a civilian. The Millers reportedly placed the Gadsden Flag on the corpse of one of the officers they killed.

Use by the left
In the mid-1970s, the New Left People's Bicentennial Commission used the Gadsden Flag symbolism on buttons and literature.

Use by the far-right
 The Gadsden flag has also been used by far-right groups and individuals. The Gadsden flag was featured prominently in a report related to the January 6, 2021 storming of the United States Capitol.

Use as a Tea Party symbol
Beginning in 2009, the Gadsden flag became widely used as a protest symbol by American Tea Party movement protesters. It was also displayed by members of Congress at Tea Party rallies. In some cases, the flag was ruled to be a political, rather than a historic or military, symbol due to the strong Tea Party connection.

Legal cases involving the Gadsden flag
In March 2013, the Gadsden flag was raised at a vacant armory building in New Rochelle, New York without permission from city officials. The city ordered its removal and the United Veterans Memorial & Patriotic Association, which had maintained the U.S. flag at the armory, filed suit against the city. A federal judge dismissed the case, rejecting the United Veterans' First Amendment argument and ruling that the flagpole in question was city property and thus did not represent private speech.

In 2014, a US Postal Service employee filed a complaint about a coworker repeatedly wearing a hat with a Gadsden Flag motif at work. Postal service administration dismissed the complaint, but the United States Equal Employment Opportunity Commission reversed the decision and called for a careful investigation. The EEOC issued a statement clarifying that it did not make any decision that the Gadsden flag was a "racist symbol," or that wearing a depiction of it constituted racial discrimination.

Rainbow version

Street Patrol, a 1990s queer self defense group affiliated with Queer Nation/San Francisco, used as its logo a coiled snake over a triangle holding a ribbon with the motto "Don't Tread on Me". Some libertarian circles use a version of the flag with the snake and motto placed over a rainbow flag. Following the 2016 Orlando nightclub shooting, posters containing a rainbow Gadsden flag inscribed with "#ShootBack" were placed around West Hollywood.

Parodies

Parodies and pastiches of the Gadsden flag exist; one common design replaces the "Don't tread on me" motto with "No Step on Snek", sometimes paired with a crudely drawn snake.

Appearances in popular culture
The Gadsden flag has made numerous appearances in popular culture, particularly in post-apocalyptic stories.

In film and television
 In the 1995 The Simpsons episode "Bart vs. Australia", Bart reveals in an act of "patriotism" the phrase "Don't Tread On Me" written across his buttocks when he is supposed to be kicked by the Australian Prime Minister as a punishment.
 In the 2006 CBS apocalyptic drama series Jericho, Gadsden flags are shown several times, most notably in the series finale when Jericho's mayor, Gray Anderson (Michael Gaston), replaces the town hall's "Allied States of America" flag with a Gadsden flag.
In the 2009 NBC mockumentary sitcom Parks and Recreation, Ron Swanson (Nick Offerman) has a miniature Gadsden flag in his office.
 In the 2023 HBO apocalyptic drama series The Last of Us, Bill (Nick Offerman) has a Gadsden flag in his house.

In music
 American heavy metal band Metallica recorded a song called "Don't Tread on Me" on their self-titled fifth studio album, released in 1991. The album cover features a dark-gray picture of a coiled rattlesnake like the one found on the Gadsden Flag.

Notes

References

External links

Activism flags
Continental Marines
Flags displaying animals
Flags of the American Revolution
Flags of the United States
Historical flags
History of the Thirteen Colonies
Liberty symbols
Military flags of the United States
Political Internet memes
Snakes in art
Tea Party movement
United States Marine Corps in the 18th and 19th centuries